is a private Christian junior college in Minami-ku, Sakai, Osaka Prefecture, Japan. It was established in 1950 and closed in 2021.

See also 
 List of junior colleges in Japan
 Poole Gakuin University

Notes

External links
  

Japanese junior colleges
Private universities and colleges in Japan
Educational institutions established in 1950
Anglican Church in Japan
Universities and colleges in Osaka Prefecture
1950 establishments in Japan
Educational institutions disestablished in 2021
2021 disestablishments in Japan